Whitco is an unincorporated community and coal town in Letcher County, Kentucky, United States. A post office operated in Whitco from 1918 to 1933.

References

Unincorporated communities in Letcher County, Kentucky
Unincorporated communities in Kentucky
Coal towns in Kentucky